Up Against It was an unproduced script by Joe Orton, written in 1967.

Up Against It may also refer to:
 Up Against It!, a 1997 album by Todd Rundgren
 Up Against It (film), a 1912 romantic comedy directed by Otis Turner
 Up Against It (album), a 1986 album by The Times
 "Up Against It", a song by Pet Shop Boys from the album Bilingual